Elatine gussonei is a species of plant in the genus Elatine (waterworts). It is endemic to Malta.

Sources

References 

Elatinaceae
Endemic flora of Malta
Plants described in 1907
Flora of Malta